Michael Eklund is a Canadian television and film actor who is known for playing the role of the villain or antihero.  His characters are often described as being "creepy".

His roles include a kidnapper who terrorizes characters played by Halle Berry and Abigail Breslin in the 2013 psychological thriller The Call, serial killer Barton Mathis in the second season of the superhero TV series Arrow, drug trafficker Zane Morgan in the second season of the psychological horror drama series Bates Motel (2014), Martin, the leader of a hedonist group called "The Rowdy 3" on the sci-fi TV series Dirk Gently’s Holistic Detective Agency (2016–2017) and demon Bobo Del Rey on the sci-fi TV series Wynonna Earp (2016–2021).

Eklund won the 2008 Leo Award for Best Performance in a Supporting Role for his work on the 2007 Canadian crime drama and thriller film Walk All Over Me.

In 2012 Eklund won the Best Actor award at Fantastic Fest for his role as Dr. Geoff Burton in the psychological thriller Errors of the Human Body. He also won the 2013 Leo Award for Best Performance by a Male in a Feature Length Drama for the same role.

In 2015 Eklund won the Best Actor award presented by the Union of British Columbia Performers and Alliance of Canadian Cinema, Television and Radio Artists (UBCPA/ACTRA) for his portrayal of English photographer Eadweard Muybridge in the biographical film Eadweard.

Early life

Born in Saskatoon, Saskatchewan, Eklund fell in love with the movies at five years of age when his mother took him to see his first movie. He participated in school theatre then later decided to study painting at the Alberta College of Art in Calgary before dropping-out and moving to Vancouver in order to pursue an acting career.

Career

Television
As an actor living in Vancouver Eklund has appeared on several Canadian and American television series filmed in the area.

His first television role was in 2000 as a police officer in an episode of the sci-fi series Dark Angel. Eklund appeared on an episode of Stargate SG-1 in 2002, and appeared in 2 episodes of Battlestar Galactica the following year.  In 2005 he appeared on the Canadian series Da Vinci's Inquest and Cold Squad. He also had a recurring role on the Canadian mini-series Terminal City that same year.

Eklund appeared in 2 episodes of Smallville in different roles in 2001 and 2007. From 2005–2007 he played narcotics detective Rene Desjardins on the Canadian crime drama series Intelligence.  In 2007 Eklund also had a recurring role on the Canadian series Blood Ties.

In 2008 Eklund appeared on an episode of Supernatural. In 2009 and 2010 he appeared on episodes of the Canadian series Flashpoint . In 2010 he also appeared on episodes of the sci-fi series Caprica and Fringe. He also had a recurring role on the Canadian series Shattered that same year. In 2012 Eklund appeared in 2 episodes of the sci-fi thriller series Alcatraz. He also appeared in an episode of Arrow in 2013.

In 2014 Eklund played Zane Morgan, a recurring character in the second season of the psychological horror drama Bates Motel.  In 2015 he also played recurring character Robert Zorin on the Canadian sci-fi series Continuum.

From 2016–2017 Eklund played Martin, the punk energy vampire on the series Dirk Gently's Holistic Detective Agency In 2018 he also appeared in 3 episodes of the sci-fi series Altered Carbon as Dimi 2, an illegal copy of character Dimitri Kadmin.

In 2016 he also joined the cast of Wynonna Earp, a series filmed in Calgary, Alberta and surrounding rural areas. On the series Eklund plays Bobo Del Rey, a fur-coat wearing Revenant.

Film

In 2007 Eklund appeared in the Al Pacino thriller film 88 Minutes. In 2009, he had a small role in Terry Gilliam's The Imaginarium of Doctor Parnassus.

He played Larry in the 2010 comedy-western film Gunless with Paul Gross That same year Eklund appeared in the British-Canadian comedy film The Making of Plus One, a film that also played at Cannes in 2009.

In 2011 he starred alongside Michael Biehn in the Xavier Gens thriller The Divide as the man in the dress ' He also played the character of Father in the apocalyptic siege warfare film The Day with Dominic Monaghan and Shawn Ashmore that same year.

In 2013 Eklund played Michael Foster, a serial killer who kidnaps Abigail Breslin's character and terrorizes Halle Berry in the film The Call.

Eklund has also collaborated three times with Calgary-based film director Robert Cuffley: In 2007, he played a crime boss’s enforcer in Cuffley’s dark comedy Walk All Over Me. In 2012, he played a desperate bartender in the violent thriller Ferocious and in 2016 he starred in Chokeslam'' as Luke Petrie, a friend of the film's protagonist.

Filmography

Film

Television

Awards and nominations

References

External links

Living people
Canadian male film actors
Male actors from Saskatoon
Canadian people of Swedish descent
Year of birth missing (living people)